Sheridan is a ghost town in Sheridan County, Kansas, United States.

History
Sheridan was issued a post office in 1876. The post office was discontinued in 1888.

The Denver Extension of the Kansas Pacific Railroad was completed near Sheridan in 1868.

References

Further reading

External links
 Sheridan County maps: Current, Historic, KDOT

Former populated places in Sheridan County, Kansas
Former populated places in Kansas